This is a summary of 1953 in music in the United Kingdom, including the official charts from that year.

Events
14 January – Ralph Vaughan Williams's Sinfonia Antarctica is given its first performance in Manchester.
3 February – Kathleen Ferrier, already suffering from terminal cancer, gives a critically acclaimed performance on the first night of a new production of Gluck's Orfeo ed Euridice at the Royal Opera House.
6 February – During the second performance of Orfeo at Covent Garden, Kathleen Ferrier's left femur gives way; she completes the performance before going to hospital for treatment.
26 May – In the 1953 Coronation Honours, Herbert Howells receives a CBE and Benjamin Britten is appointed a Companion of Honour.
2 June 
The Coronation of Elizabeth II, William McKie, who had been in charge of music at the royal wedding in 1947, is organist. In addition to traditional music, such as Handel's "Zadok the Priest", Hubert Parry's "I was glad" and Samuel Sebastian Wesley's "Thou wilt keep him in perfect peace", specially commissioned works performed at the ceremony include Ralph Vaughan Williams's "O Taste and See", William Walton's "Orb and Sceptre", Arthur Bliss's "Processional", Arnold Bax's "Coronation March", and the Canadian composer Healy Willan's anthem "O Lord our Governor". 
On the evening of the coronation, Sadler's Wells Ballet stages the first performance of Malcolm Arnold's official coronation ballet Homage to the Queen, with choreography by Frederick Ashton and Robert Irving conducting.
9 June – Kathleen Ferrier writes to the secretary of the Royal Philharmonic Society, thanking them for the award of the gold medal; it is thought to be the last letter she ever signed in person.
29 August – Michael Tippett's Fantasia Concertante on a Theme of Corelli is first performed in Edinburgh.
October – Sir Arthur Bliss replaces Sir Arnold Bax as Master of the Queen's Music.
19 September – Sir Hubert Parry's 1916 setting of William Blake's "Jerusalem" first appears as a permanent feature of the Last Night of the Proms (televised).
19 October – Opening of the Covent Garden opera season, with a production of Wagner's Die Walküre.

Chart summary
See List of UK top-ten singles in 1953

Number Ones

Number-one singles 
{| class="wikitable" style="font-size:97%; text-align:center;"
! Issue Date !! Song !! Artist
|-
| 4 January || "Here in My Heart" || Al Martino 
|-
| 11 January || "You Belong to Me" || Jo Stafford
|-
| 18 January || "Comes A-Long A-Love" || Kay Starr
|-
| 25 January || "Outside of Heaven" || Eddie Fisher
|- 
| 1 February || rowspan="5"|"Don't Let the Stars Get in Your Eyes" || rowspan="5"|Perry Como and the Ramblers
|-
| 8 February
|-
| 15 February
|-
| 22 February
|-
| 1 March
|-
| 8 March || rowspan="4"|"She Wears Red Feathers" || rowspan="4"|Guy Mitchell
|- 
| 15 March
|-
| 22 March
|-
| 29 March 
|-
| 5 April || "Broken Wings" || Stargazers
|-
| 12 April || "(How Much Is) That Doggie in the Window?" || Lita Roza
|-
| 19 April || rowspan="9"|"I Believe" || rowspan="9"|Frankie Laine
|-
| 26 April 
|-
| 3 May 
|-
| 10 May
|-
| 17 May
|-
| 24 May
|-
| 31 May
|-
| 7 June
|-
| 14 June
|-
| 21 June || "I'm Walking Behind You" || Eddie Fisher
|- 
| 28 June || rowspan="6"|"I Believe" || rowspan="6"|Frankie Laine
|- 
| 5 July
|-
| 12 July
|-
| 19 July
|-
| 26 July
|-
| 2 August
|-
| 9 August || "The Song from the Moulin Rouge" || Mantovani
|-
| 16 August || rowspan="3"|"I Believe" || rowspan="3"|Frankie Laine
|-
| 23 August
|-
| 30 August
|-
| 6 September || rowspan="6"|"Look at That Girl" || rowspan="6"|Guy Mitchell
|-
| 13 September
|-
| 20 September
|-
| 27 September
|-
| 4 October
|-
| 11 October
|-
| 18 October || rowspan="2"|"Hey Joe" || rowspan="2"|Frankie Laine
|-
| 25 October 
|-
| 1 November || rowspan="9"|"Answer Me" || David Whitfield
|-
| 8 November || rowspan="8"|Frankie Laine
|-
| 15 November 
|-
| 22 November
|-
| 29 November
|-
| 6 December
|-
| 13 December
|-
| 20 December 
|-
| 27 December
|-
|}

Classical music
Malcolm Arnold – Symphony No. 2
Michael Tippett Variations on an Elizabethan Theme

Opera
Benjamin Britten – Gloriana

Film and Incidental music
Stanley Black – Escape by Night, starring Sid James.
Alan Rawsthorne – The Cruel Sea, starring Jack Hawkins, Donald Sinden and Denholm Elliott.

Musical films
The Beggar's Opera, directed by Peter Brook and starring Laurence Olivier, Dorothy Tutin, and Stanley Holloway.
The Story of Gilbert and Sullivan, directed by Sidney Gilliat and starring Robert Morley, Maurice Evans and Owen Brannigan

Births
28 January – Chris Carter, English DJ and producer
22 February – Graham Lewis, bass player
3 March – Robyn Hitchcock, singer-songwriter
9 April – John Howard, singer-songwriter
15 May – Mike Oldfield, composer
8 June – Bonnie Tyler, singer
19 June – Simon Wright, English drummer (AC/DC, Dio, and UFO)
20 July – Dave Evans, Welsh-Australian singer-songwriter (AC/DC and Rabbit)
22 July 
Nigel Hess, composer
Brian Howe, singer-songwriter (Bad Company)
27 July – Eibhlis Farrell, composer
2 August – Donnie Munro, Scottish singer and guitarist (Runrig)
3 August – Ian Bairnson, multi-instrumentalist (Alan Parsons Project)
10 August – Gillian Elisa, actress, singer, and comedian
23 August – Bobby G, singer (Bucks Fizz)
16 October – Brinsley Forde, singer (Aswad)
21 October – Eric Faulkner, guitarist, songwriter, and singer (Bay City Rollers)
12 November – Calum Macdonald, percussionist with Runrig

Deaths
18 January – Arthur Wood, conductor and composer, 78
30 April – Lily Brayton, musical theatre star, 76
15 May – Mabel Love, dancer, 78
19 May – Frank Mullings, operatic tenor, 72
21 September – Roger Quilter, composer, 75
3 October – Sir Arnold Bax, composer, Master of the King's (and later Queen's) Musick, 69
8 October – Kathleen Ferrier, contralto, 41 (cancer)
26 November – Sir Ivor Atkins, organist and choirmaster, 83
11 December – Albert Coates, conductor and composer, 71
date unknown – John Reynders, film score composer

See also
 1953 in British television
 1953 in the United Kingdom
 List of British films of 1953

References

General
 (Type artist or song into search box and click "Search". To view a certain chart week, type the date into the box with the date and click "Go".)

 
British Music, 1953 In
Music
British music by year